Liz Truss was invited by Queen Elizabeth II—two days before the monarch's death—to succeed Boris Johnson as prime minister of the United Kingdom on 6 September 2022. Johnson resigned as leader of the Conservative Party the previous day and resigned as prime minister on 6 September following the election of Truss as the new leader of the Conservative Party on 5 September. The Truss ministry was formed from the 2019 Parliament of the United Kingdom, as a Conservative majority government. With Queen Elizabeth's death on 8 September 2022, Truss became the first UK prime minister to serve under more than one monarch since Winston Churchill in 1952.

On 20 October 2022, amid growing disapproval of her leadership from within the Conservative Party, Truss announced her resignation in a speech outside 10 Downing Street, stating that she would remain in office until a new leader was chosen. She added that this would happen by the end of the following week, making her tenure the shortest in the history of the United Kingdom. The cabinet was dissolved after the appointment of Rishi Sunak as prime minister on 25 October.

Cabinet

September 2022October 2022

Changes
 Kwasi Kwarteng was dismissed on 14 October 2022 after market turmoil following the September mini-budget. He was replaced by former Foreign Secretary Jeremy Hunt. Chris Philp swapped jobs with Edward Argar on the same day.
 Suella Braverman resigned as Home Secretary on 19 October 2022. She was replaced by former Transport Secretary Grant Shapps.

List of ministers

Prime Minister and Cabinet Office

Departments of state

Law officers

Parliament

Departures from the Truss ministry

There were resignations from the Truss ministry after forming a government on 6 September 2022. Truss faced the departure of two cabinet ministers and one junior minister. In addition, she dismissed ministers that served under the previous government.

Non-ministerial appointments

Parliamentary Private Secretaries

Prime Minister's Office

Party Officers

Second Church Estates Commissioner

Notes

References

2022 establishments in the United Kingdom
2022 disestablishments in the United Kingdom
2020s in British politics
British ministries
Cabinets established in 2022
Cabinets disestablished in 2022
Ministries of Elizabeth II
Ministries of Charles III
Liz Truss
History of the Conservative Party (UK)